Lo Chu-yin (born 6 October 1965) is a Taiwanese footballer who played as a defender for the Chinese Taipei women's national football team. She was part of the team at the 1991 FIFA Women's World Cup. In club-level matches she played for Mulan in Taiwan.

References

External links
 

1965 births
Living people
Taiwanese women's footballers
Chinese Taipei women's international footballers
Place of birth missing (living people)
1991 FIFA Women's World Cup players
Women's association football defenders
Footballers at the 1990 Asian Games
Asian Games competitors for Chinese Taipei